The Society of Wildlife Artists is a British organisation for artists who paint or draw wildlife. It was founded in 1964. Its founder President was Sir Peter Scott, the current President of the society is British artist Harriet Mead.

The society was founded by Eric Ennion and Robert Gillmor. Other founder members were Donald Watson, a former President of the Scottish Ornithologists' Club artist James T.A. Osborne a Fellow of the Royal Society of Painter-Etchers, and artist Eileen Soper.

The Society holds an annual exhibition at the Federation of British Artists in the Mall Galleries, every September/ October.

The society  is a registered charity in England and Wales, number 328717.

See also
Federation of British Artists
Wildlife art
List of wildlife artists

References

External links
 

Wildlife artists
British artist groups and collectives
1964 establishments in the United Kingdom
Arts organizations established in 1964